Obed Harvey Agbomadzie (born 1 June 1990) is a Ghanaian cricketer. He was named in Ghana's squad for the 2017 ICC World Cricket League Division Five tournament in South Africa. He played in Ghana's opening fixture, against Germany, on 3 September 2017. He scored the most runs for Ghana in the tournament, with a total of 153 runs in five matches. He also took the most wickets for Ghana, with a total of thirteen dismissals in five matches.

In August 2021, he was named as the captain of Ghana's squad for their Twenty20 International (T20I) series against Rwanda. He made his T20I debut for Ghana on 18 August 2021, against Rwanda.

References

External links
 

1990 births
Living people
Ghanaian cricketers
Ghana Twenty20 International cricketers
Place of birth missing (living people)